Dezh Gah (also Romanized as Dezh Gāh; also known as Dozgāh) is a village in Dezh Gah Rural District, Dehram District, Farashband County, Fars Province, Iran. At the 2006 census, its population was 268, in 70 families.

References 

Populated places in Farashband County